John Patton Jr. (1850–1907) was a U.S. Senator from Michigan from 1894 to 1895. Senator Patton may also refer to:

B. R. Patton (1920–1999), Louisiana State Senate
E. Earl Patton (1927–2011), Georgia State Senate
John Patton (Wyoming politician) (1930–2015), Wyoming State Senate
Nat Patton (1881–1957), Texas State Senate
Robert M. Patton (1809–1885), Alabama State Senate
Tom Patton (born 1953), Ohio State Senate

See also
Bernard M. Patten, New York State Senate